A28 is a motorway (freeway) in Portugal.  It connects Porto to Viana do Castelo, further extending to Valença, on the border with Galicia (Spain). It crosses with the A27, A7, A11, and A41 motorways.

References

Motorways in Portugal